Gabriel Cornelius Ritter von Max (23 August 1840 – 24 November 1915) was a Prague-born Austrian painter.

Biography

He was born Gabriel Cornelius Max, the son of the sculptor Josef Max and Anna Schumann. He studied between 1855 and 1858 at the Prague Academy of Arts with Eduard von Engerth. His studies included parapsychology (somnambulism, hypnotism, spiritism), Darwinism, Asiatic philosophy, the ideas of Schopenhauer, and various mystical traditions. The spiritual-mystical movement was emphasized by the writings of Carl du Prel, and the Munich painter Albert Keller was also an influence.

His first large canvas was painted in 1858 while he was a student at the Prague Academy. He continued his studies at the Viennese Academy of Art with Karl von Blaas, Christian Ruben and Carl Wurzinger. From 1863 to 1867 he studied at the Munich Academy with Karl Theodor von Piloty, and also Hans Makart and Franz Defregger. His first critical success was in 1867 with the painting "Martyr at the Cross": that painting transformed the "Unglücksmalerei" (dark palette) of Piloty into a religious-mystical symbolism using a psychological rendering of its subject.
 
He continued to use the dark palette of the Piloty school well into the 1870s, later moving toward a more muted palette, using fewer, clearer colors. From 1869, Gabriel von Max had his studio in Munich; in the summer, he was in Ammerland, and from 1893 in Ambach at Starnberger Lake. From 1879-1883, Gabriel Max was a professor of Historical Painting at the Munich Academy; he also became a Fellow of The Theosophical Society. In 1900 he was ennobled and became a Ritter. He died in Munich in 1915.

His interest in anthropological studies also showed in his work. He owned a large scientific collection of prehistoric ethnological and anthropological finds: the collection and his correspondence now reside in the Reiss-Engelhorn-Museen in Mannheim. In a garden house in Munich, Gabriel Max kept a herd of monkeys from 1869 to about 1873, which he photographed and sketched. Later he used the material for large paintings in which he sometimes depicted the animals as people. Max, along with his colleagues, often used photographs to guide painting. The great number of monkey photographs in his archive testify to their use as direct translation into his paintings. In 1908, his painting "The Lion's Bride" became celebrated, and was depicted in motion pictures as an hommage in the Gloria Swanson film, Male and Female, (1919), directed by Cecil B. de Mille.

Gabriel von Max was a significant artist to emerge from the Piloty School, because he abandoned the themes of the Grunderzeitliche (genre and history), in order to develop an allegorical-mystical pictorial language, which became typical of Secessionist Art. Characteristic of the ethereal style of Gabriel Max is "The Last Token" (in the Metropolitan Museum), and "Light" (in the Odessa Museum of Western and Eastern Art, Ukraine).

The largest collection of the work of Gabriel von Max in the United States is held by the Jack Daulton Collection in Los Altos Hills, California. Also, Gabriel von Max's work can be found in the collection of Milan Jovanović Stojimirović who bequeathed his vast collection of paintings and artifacts to the Art Department of the Museum in Smederevo.

References

Sources 
 Agathon Klemt: Gabriel Max und seine Werke, Gesellschaft für moderne Kunst, Wien 1886
 Nicolaus Mann: Gabriel Max, eine kulturhistorische Skizze, Weber, Leipzig 1890
 Franz H. Meißner: Gabriel von Max, Hanfstaengl, München 1899
 Johannes Muggenthaler (Hrsg.): Der Geister Bahnen. Eine Ausstellung zu Ehren von Gabriel von Max, 1849-1915, Mosel & Tschechow, München 1988, 
 Harald Siebenhaar: Gabriel von Max und die Moderne, in: Klaus G. Beuckers (Hrsg.): Festschrift für Johanne Langner,  Lit Verlag, Münster 1997, 
 Thieme-Becker, Bd.XXIV, pp. 288/289.
 Adolf Rosenberg, The Munich School of Painters and their development since 1871, Hanover 1887, pp. 15–18.
 Fritz von Ostini, Nachruf auf Gabriel von Max in: Muncher Neueste Nachrichten, 1915.
 Cat. Neue Pinakothek, Munich. Bd. VI, Painters of the Grunderzeit, Editor Horst Ludwig. Munich 1977, pp. 238–243.
 Ausst, Cat. Neue Pinakothek, Munich. The Munich School 1850-1914, Munich 1979, pp. 304–307.
 Klaus Popitz, The Fruhe Poster in Europe and the USA, Vol.3, Germany.
 Jo-Anne Birnie Danzker (Ed.): Gabriel von Max, Frye Art Museum, Seattle 2011,

External links 
 
 Collection of Works by Gabriel von Max
 Period archives biography Retrieved 19-08- 2008
 Art Renewal Center Gallery Retrieved 19-08- 2008
 Gabriel von Max's "Bitter (Sour) Experiences", a conversation between art historian Jennifer Tonkovich and art collector Jack Daulton, part 1
 Gabriel von Max's "Bitter (Sour) Experiences", a conversation between art historian Jennifer Tonkovich and art collector Jack Daulton, part 2

19th-century Austrian painters
19th-century male artists
Austrian male painters
20th-century Austrian painters
20th-century male artists
19th-century German painters
German male painters
20th-century German painters
German Christians
Austrian Christians
Austrian knights
Austro-Hungarian people
German people of Austrian descent
Artists from Prague
1840 births
1915 deaths